The 2010 Allan Cup was the Canadian championship of senior ice hockey. This tournament was the 102nd year that the Allan Cup has been awarded. The 2010 tournament was hosted by the City of Fort St. John, British Columbia and the Fort St. John Flyers.

2010 Allan Cup Participants
 Fort St. John Flyers (Host)
Host of 2010 Allan Cup.
12-3-2-1 Record in North Peace Hockey League (First in West Division).
Did not participate in BC Sr. "AAA" Playdowns.
 Clarenville Caribous (Atlantic)
Only Sr. "AAA" team East of Ontario.
16-6-0-2 Record in West Coast Senior Hockey League (First Overall).
Defeated Corner Brook Royals 4-0, Defeated Grand Falls-Windsor Cataracts 4-2 to win WCSHL Playoffs.
Defeated Conception Bay North CeeBee Stars 4-1 to win Herder Memorial Trophy.
 Bentley Generals (Alberta)
19-1-0-0 Record in Chinook Hockey League (First Overall).
Defeated Stony Plain Eagles 2-1, Defeated Fort Saskatchewan Chiefs 2-1 to win ChHL Championship.
Defeated Fort Saskatchewan Chiefs 4-1 for Alberta "AAA" Championship.
2009 Allan Cup Champions.
 Powell River Regals (Pacific)
Played independent schedule in both Sr. "AAA" and "AA".
Won Coy Cup BC Sr. "AA" tournament with 3-2 win over Mid-Island Blazers.
Defeated Whitehorse Huskies 3-0 to win Pacific Seed.
 South East Prairie Thunder (Western)
Played independent schedule.
Defeated Steinbach North Stars 3-1 for Pattison Cup, Defeated Lloydminster Border Kings 3-1 for Rathgaber Cup.
2009 Allan Cup finalists.
 Dundas Real McCoys (Central)
19-3-0-2 Record in Major League Hockey (First Overall).
Finished second in playoff round robin (5-3), Defeated Whitby Dunlops 4-1 to win Robertson Cup.
Defeated Kenora Thistles 2-0 to win Renwick Cup as Central Canada Champions.

Round robin

Results

Championship Round

Quarter and Semi-finals

Final

National Playdowns
Listed are the registered teams per tournament seat.

Alberta
 Bentley Generals
 Fort Saskatchewan Chiefs
 Stony Plain Eagles

Brackets

Atlantic Canada
 Clarenville Caribous (Newfoundland and Labrador)
Clarenville automatically is entered into Allan Cup due to being the only registered Sr. AAA team in the region.

Pacific

Teams
 Fort St. John Flyers (Allan Cup hosts)
 Powell River Regals
 Whitehorse Huskies

Brackets
With Fort St. John already in the 2010 Allan Cup as hosts, it will be up to Powell River and Whitehorse to play a series for the British Columbia seed to the National Championship.

Western

Teams

Brackets
In Manitoba, Steinbach and Manitoba will square-off in a best-of-seven series to determine who faces Southeast for the Manitoba crown. In Saskatchewan, Paradise Hill and Lloydminster face-off for the Saskatchewan Sr. AAA championship. The winners of these two provinces will face each other to determine the Manitoba/Saskatchewan seed to the 2010 Allan Cup.

Central

Teams

Brackets
In Southern Ontario, the top three teams of Major League Hockey will play a double round robin and then the top two teams from the round robin will play a best-of-7 series to determine an Ontario Hockey Association champion. In Northwestern Ontario, a one-game per opponent round robin will determine a one-game runoff for the Hockey Northwestern Ontario crown. When the two teams are determined, they will meet in a best-of-3 series to determine the Ontario seed to the 2010 Allan Cup.

(*) Thunder Bay replaces Fort Frances, Fort Frances found to have an ineligible player.

References

External links

Administration
 Official Allan Cup website 
 Official Hockey Canada website

Teams
 Clarenville Caribous
 Fort St. John Flyers

Leagues
 Major League Hockey
 Chinook Hockey League

Allan Cup
Allan Cup
Fort St. John, British Columbia